A constitutional referendum was held in Kyrgyzstan on 22 October 1994. Voters were asked questions on two topics:
Whether they approved of using referendums to decide on amendments to the constitution, laws and other important questions of political life.
Whether they approved of the introduction of a bicameral parliament.
Both were approved by almost 90% of voters, with turnout reported to be 86.0%.

Results

Question 1

Question 2

References

1994 in Kyrgyzstan
1994 referendums
Referendums in Kyrgyzstan
Constitutional referendums in Kyrgyzstan